Brigitte Seiwald (born 12 September 1945 in Innsbruck) is an Austrian former alpine skier who competed in the 1968 Winter Olympics.

External links
 sports-reference.com
 

1945 births
Living people
Austrian female alpine skiers
Olympic alpine skiers of Austria
Alpine skiers at the 1968 Winter Olympics
Sportspeople from Innsbruck
20th-century Austrian women